Adriana Dos Santos Araújo (born 4 November 1981) is a Brazilian professional boxer. As an amateur she won a bronze medal in the lightweight division at the 2012 Olympics and qualified for the 2016 Olympics at the same weight.

Boxing career

Olympic Games
Women's boxing debuted at the 2012 Summer Olympics, with Araújo selected to represent Brazil. She progressed to the semi-finals of the boxing tournament, where she lost on points 17–11 against Sofya Ochigava from Russia. Ochigava was the world's number two and went on to win the silver medal in the event. Araújo was awarded bronze alongside Mavzuna Chorieva from Tajikistan, and became the only competitor from a Latin American country to win a medal in any of the women's boxing events. In addition, it was the first time in 44 years that an athlete from Brazil had won a medal in one of the boxing events.

Araújo was disappointed to have only won bronze, although she looked forward to attending the 2016 Summer Olympics in Rio de Janeiro, but said that she would not be competing as she was planning on turning professional before then. However, she has once again been selected to represent Brazil and felt that competing in her home country would provide a boost to her chances of a gold medal. Brazil had used one of their automatic qualification places as the host country for Araújo, meaning that she did not have to qualify. Shortly prior to the games, Araújo was one of 141 torchbearers on the first day of the Brazilian leg of the 2016 Summer Olympics torch relay.

Professional boxing record

References

External links

 
 

1981 births
Living people
Sportspeople from São Paulo
Boxers at the 2012 Summer Olympics
Boxers at the 2016 Summer Olympics
Olympic boxers of Brazil
Olympic bronze medalists for Brazil
Brazilian women boxers
Olympic medalists in boxing
Medalists at the 2012 Summer Olympics
South American Games gold medalists for Brazil
South American Games medalists in boxing
Competitors at the 2010 South American Games
Lightweight boxers
Light-welterweight boxers
Welterweight boxers
20th-century Brazilian women
21st-century Brazilian women